This is a list of the National Register of Historic Places listings in Adams County, Wisconsin. It is intended to provide a comprehensive listing of entries in the National Register of Historic Places that are located in Adams County, Wisconsin.  The locations of National Register properties for which the latitude and longitude coordinates are included below may be seen in a map.

There are 3 properties and districts listed on the National Register in the county.

Current listings

|}

See also
 List of National Historic Landmarks in Wisconsin
 National Register of Historic Places listings in Wisconsin
 Listings in neighboring counties: Columbia, Juneau, Marquette, Portage, Sauk, Waushara, Wood

References

 
Adams